Time Out is an Indian 2017 comedy-drama mini web series directed by Danish Aslam and produced by Voot, starring Tahir Raj Bhasin and Sarah-Jane Dias in the lead roles. It premiered on the video streaming platform Voot in 2017.

Plot 
The series deals with marriage issues in a comic and dramatic way. It is about a happily married couple Rahul (Tahir Raj Bhasin) and Radha (Sarah-Jane Dias). Their relationship is full of romance and going smooth and sound. Rahul and his spouse, Radha who is trying to become pregnant. It all begins with Rahul when he learns that his wife is preganent. And, reinforcing most of the male stereotypes out there, Rahul doesn't want a kid. He realizes he has been leading the life he is supposed to and not necessarily the one he wants to.

Cast

Main 
 Tahir Raj Bhasin as Rahul
 Sarah-Jane Dias as Radha
 Rohan Khurana as Zain
 Shishir Sharma as Rajat
 Sahil Vaid as Ashish
 Bikramjeet Kanwarpal as Bansal
 Rashi Mal as Kaya
 Jugal Hansraj as Ved
 Mansi Multani as Priya

Release 
Time Out had released on Voot on 27 November 2017. Its trailer ammased nearly 107,000 views on YouTube.

Episodes

Season 1

Reception

Critical reviews 
Almas Khateeb of The Quint wrote "here really are no shades of grey with such shows. I do give it to Voot for coming up with Time Out. It does address issues like ‘urban poverty’, extra-marital affairs, unwilling parenthood, and more. What it doesn't do however, is execute them with any reality."

Rahul Desai from Film Companion said "Time Out is pretentious and silly because it tries to appear confident about its decorated sentiments and sanitized sinning. It's important someone like Tahir Raj Bhasin realises that he can be better than this. It's essential that the makers don't think they can continue creating myopic Riverdale worlds out of real-life experiences."

A reviewer for The Opinionated Indian reviewed the show more positively "Romcom aficionados will love this show. The show can be enjoyed by the Netflix drama loving audience as well. Do not watch it expecting to get an out of this world experience. It is a simple story, made complex by the life choices of the lead pair. It does have a message for all urban married couples, who have started off on their journey together."

References

External links 

 

Comedy-drama web series
2017 web series debuts
Indian web series
Hindi-language web series